Melfjellet is a prominent rock outcrop in the eastern part of the Hansen Mountains, Antarctica, about  southeast of See Nunatak. It was mapped and named by Norwegian cartographers from air photos taken by the Lars Christensen Expedition, 1936–37.

References

External links

Rock formations of Kemp Land